Porky's Duck Hunt is a 1937 Warner Bros. Looney Tunes cartoon directed by Tex Avery. The cartoon was released on April 17, 1937, and stars Porky Pig and Daffy Duck, the latter making what is considered his first official appearance.

Plot
Porky is well equipped and ready to begin duck hunting. Porky practices with his rifle, frightens his dog, Rover and shoots a man upstairs, who comes down to punch Porky in the snout.

At a lake, Porky spies a duck, but other duck hunters suddenly appear and shoot at it for several seconds. They all miss. A cross-eyed duck hunter tries to shoot the same duck but instead shoots down two planes.

Porky puts out duck decoys. Daffy arrives and blends among them. Porky wears a decoy on his head, walks underwater and tries to shoot Daffy, but the gun shoots out water instead of bullets. Daffy then flies onto a floating barrel of poison (labeled 'XXX' – a period designation for whiskey). Porky shoots the whiskey-filled barrel but Daffy escapes. Some fish are attracted to the poison and get drunk. The fish come onshore, commandeer a boat and drunkenly sing 'On Moonlight Bay'.

Daffy bites Porky on the nose as he peers through the grass. Porky shoots Daffy down and instructs Rover to bring the duck back, but when he comes back, it's Daffy carrying the dog and throwing him back on the bank. Porky whips out a notepad, leafs through it and notes that this scene 'wasn't in the script'. Daffy yells out his first words, that he is "just a crazy, darn fool duck", and proceeds to do his signature 'crazy dance' on the lake.

After a humorous scene where Daffy eats an electric eel and shocks himself, Porky tries hunting from a rowboat but is taunted by the ducks when he stops for lunch. In his hurry to fire at them he inadvertently sinks the boat, cueing Joe Penner to rise from underneath the water with his signature line "You wanna buy a duck?"

Alerted by Rover that Daffy is back, Porky makes several attempts to cock the gun and shoot, but when Daffy covers his ears with his hands once again the gun fails to fire each time. Daffy comes out of the water, takes the gun and fires it after the first cock. Daffy takes to the air and is met by Porky shooting his gun rapid-fire and being driven into the ground by the recoil, apparently not hitting anything. Porky tries to use a duck call, but the other duck hunters mistake it for a real duck and shoot at Porky. Disgusted, Porky throws the duck call to the ground, but it bounces and Rover accidentally swallows it. Rover gets the hiccups, quacking with each one, drawing constant fire and forcing Porky and Rover to flee from the lake.

Porky and Rover trudge home, disappointed with their failure to bag a duck. When Porky gets home, he sees the ducks outside doing a trapeze act in the sky at his window. Porky tries to shoot them with his gun but, thinking the gun is empty, throws the shotgun to the floor. The gun fires into the ceiling, getting the guy from upstairs to come and punch Porky in the snout again. The cartoon ends with Daffy dancing and bouncing around the "That's All Folks!" title card.

Voice cast
Information is based on the book "Mel Blanc: The Man of a Thousand Voices"

Mel Blanc as Porky Pig, Daffy Duck
Billy Bletcher as Bass Fish, The Guy Upstairs
Additional speaking voices are provided by Danny Webb
Singing performed by the Sportsmen Quartet

Home media
VHS – Daffy Duck: The Nuttiness Continues... (time-compressed)
DVD – The Essential Daffy Duck
DVD – Porky Pig 101

Notes
This short, starring Porky Pig, features the first appearance of Daffy Duck. Also notable is that this is the first cartoon in which Mel Blanc voices both Porky and Daffy. Originally scheduled to voice the duck, Blanc won the part of Porky earlier that year. Joe Dougherty, who was Porky's original voice actor, was fired following the cartoon Porky's Romance because he could not control his stutter.
Porky's Duck Hunt was a very popular cartoon, well known for popular gags and the debut of Daffy Duck, and met with very positive reviews. Only a year later, this cartoon was reworked by Avery as Daffy Duck and Egghead, which was in color. In that cartoon, Porky's role was filled by another Avery-created character, Egghead (who evolved into Elmer Fudd in the 1940 cartoon Elmer's Candid Camera), and Daffy is given his name.

References

External links

Porky's Duck Hunt on the Internet Archive
Official Looney Tunes Website
Watch Porky's Duck Hunt here

1937 films
1937 animated films
1937 short films
American black-and-white films
Films directed by Tex Avery
Films about hunters
Looney Tunes shorts
1930s American animated films
Daffy Duck films
Porky Pig films